The 1923 Kalamazoo Hornets football team was an American football team that represented Kalamazoo College during the 1923 college football season. In Maynard Street's first year as head coach, the Hornets compiled a record of 0–10, the worst season record in program history. Kalamazoo also finished with its worst point spread in history, having been outscored by a total of 477 to 30.

Schedule

References

Kalamazoo
Kalamazoo Hornets football seasons
College football winless seasons
Kalamazoo football